Ubon Ratchathani University Stadium is a multi-purpose stadium in Ubon Ratchathani Province , Thailand.  It is currently used mostly for football matches and is the home stadium of Ubon Ratchathani F.C.

Multi-purpose stadiums in Thailand
Buildings and structures in Ubon Ratchathani province